Harold Murphy may refer to:

 Harold Lloyd Murphy (born 1927), United States federal judge
 Harold Murphy (politician) (1938–2015), American politician

See also
Harry Murphy (disambiguation)